Gastrin is a peptide hormone that stimulates secretion of gastric acid (HCl) by the parietal cells of the stomach and aids in gastric motility. It is released by G cells in the pyloric antrum of the stomach, duodenum, and the pancreas.

Gastrin binds to cholecystokinin B receptors to stimulate the release of histamines in enterochromaffin-like cells, and it induces the insertion of K+/H+ ATPase pumps into the apical membrane of parietal cells (which in turn increases H+ release into the stomach cavity). Its release is stimulated by peptides in the lumen of the stomach.

Physiology

Genetics

In humans, the GAS gene is located on the long arm of the seventeenth chromosome (17q21).

Synthesis
Gastrin is a linear peptide hormone produced by G cells of the duodenum and in the pyloric antrum of the stomach. It is secreted into the bloodstream. The encoded polypeptide is preprogastrin, which is cleaved by enzymes in posttranslational modification to produce progastrin (an intermediate, inactive precursor) and then gastrin in various forms, primarily the following three: 
 gastrin-34 ("big gastrin")
 gastrin-17 ("little gastrin")
 gastrin-14 ("minigastrin")

Also, pentagastrin is an artificially synthesized, five amino acid sequence identical to the last five amino acid sequence at the C-terminus end of gastrin.
The numbers refer to the amino acid count.

Release
Gastrin is released in response to certain stimuli.  These include:
 stomach antrum distension
 vagal stimulation (mediated by the neurocrine bombesin, or GRP in humans)
 the presence of partially digested proteins, especially amino acids, in the stomach. Aromatic amino acids are particularly powerful stimuli for gastrin release.
 hypercalcemia (via calcium-sensing receptors)

Gastrin release is inhibited by:
 the presence of acid (primarily the secreted HCl) in the stomach (a case of negative feedback)
 somatostatin also inhibits the release of gastrin, along with secretin, GIP (gastroinhibitory peptide), VIP (vasoactive intestinal peptide), glucagon and calcitonin.

Function 

The presence of gastrin stimulates parietal cells of the stomach to secrete hydrochloric acid (HCl)/gastric acid.  This is done both directly on the parietal cell  and indirectly via binding onto CCK2/gastrin receptors on ECL cells in the stomach, which then responds by releasing histamine, which in turn acts in a paracrine manner on parietal cells stimulating them to secrete H+ ions. This is the major stimulus for acid secretion by parietal cells.

Along with the above-mentioned function, gastrin has been shown to have additional functions as well:

 Stimulates parietal cell maturation and fundal growth.
 Causes chief cells to secrete pepsinogen, the zymogen (inactive) form of the digestive enzyme pepsin.
 Increases antral muscle mobility and promotes stomach contractions.
 Strengthens antral contractions against the pylorus, and relaxes the pyloric sphincter, which increases the rate of gastric emptying.
 Plays a role in the relaxation of the ileocecal valve.
 Induces pancreatic secretions and gallbladder emptying.
 May impact lower esophageal sphincter (LES) tone, causing it to contract, - although pentagastrin, rather than endogenous gastrin, may be the cause.
 Gastrin contributes to the gastrocolic reflex.

Factors influencing secretion
Factors influencing secretion of gastrin can be divided into 2 categories:

Physiologic

Gastric lumen
 Stimulatory factors: dietary protein and amino acids (meat), hypercalcemia. (i.e. during the gastric phase)
 Inhibitory factor: acidity (pH below 3) - a negative feedback mechanism, exerted via the release of somatostatin from δ cells in the stomach, which inhibits gastrin and histamine release.

Paracrine
 Stimulatory factor: bombesin or gastrin-releasing peptide (GRP)
 Inhibitory factor: somatostatin - acts on somatostatin-2 receptors on G cells. in a paracrine manner via local diffusion in the intercellular spaces, but also systemically through its release into the local mucosal blood circulation; it inhibits acid secretion by acting on parietal cells.

Nervous
 Stimulatory factors: Beta-adrenergic agents, cholinergic agents, gastrin-releasing peptide (GRP)
 Inhibitory factor: Enterogastric reflex

Circulation
 Stimulatory factor: gastrin
 Inhibitory factors:gastric inhibitory peptide (GIP), secretin, somatostatin, glucagon, calcitonin

Pathophysiologic

Paraneoplastic
 Gastrinoma paraneoplastic oversecretion (see Role in disease)

Role in disease 
In the Zollinger–Ellison syndrome, gastrin is produced at excessive levels, often by a gastrinoma gastrin-producing tumor, mostly benign of the duodenum or the pancreas. To investigate for hypergastrinemia high blood levels of gastrin, a "pentagastrin test" can be performed.

In autoimmune gastritis, the immune system attacks the parietal cells leading to hypochlorhydria low stomach acid secretion.  This results in an elevated gastrin level in an attempt to compensate for increased pH in the stomach.  Eventually, all the parietal cells are lost and achlorhydria results leading to a loss of negative feedback on gastrin secretion. Plasma gastrin concentration is elevated in virtually all individuals with mucolipidosis type IV (mean 1507 pg/mL; range 400-4100 pg/mL) (normal 0-200 pg/mL) secondary to a constitutive achlorhydria. This finding facilitates the diagnosis of patients with this neurogenetic disorder. Additionally, elevated gastrin levels may be present in chronic gastritis resulting from H pylori infection.

History
Its existence was first suggested in 1905 by the British physiologist John Sydney Edkins, and gastrins were isolated in 1964 by Hilda Tracy and Roderic Alfred Gregory at the University of Liverpool. In 1964 the structure of gastrin was determined.

References

Further reading

External links 
 Overview at colostate.edu
 

Peptide hormones
Gastric hormones
Digestive system
Cholecystokinin agonists